is a former freestyle swimmer from Japan, who competed for her native country at the 1996 Summer Olympics in Atlanta, Georgia. There she finished in fourth place in the 4 × 200 m freestyle relay, alongside Aiko Miyake, Naoko Imoto, and Suzu Chiba.

On her individual starts, in the 400m freestyle, she ended up in 7th place, clocking 4:11.68 in the final; and in tenth place in the 800m freestyle with a time of 8:40.47 (preliminary heats). A year later, Yamanoi won the gold medal in the 400 free at the Summer Universiade. In 1998, she finished third in the 800m freestyle at the Asian Games in Bangkok, Thailand.

She is a graduate of Ina Junior High School in Tsukubamirai, Ibaraki, known locally for its Olympic-size swimming pool.

References

1978 births
Living people
Swimmers at the 1996 Summer Olympics
Olympic swimmers of Japan
Place of birth missing (living people)
Japanese female freestyle swimmers
World Aquatics Championships medalists in swimming
Asian Games medalists in swimming
Universiade medalists in swimming
Asian Games gold medalists for Japan
Asian Games silver medalists for Japan
Asian Games bronze medalists for Japan
Swimmers at the 1994 Asian Games
Swimmers at the 1998 Asian Games
Medalists at the 1994 Asian Games
Medalists at the 1998 Asian Games
Universiade gold medalists for Japan
Universiade bronze medalists for Japan
Medalists at the 1997 Summer Universiade